The second series of the British sitcom series 'Allo 'Allo! contains seven episodes which first aired between 21 October and 26 December 1985.

Series 2 sees the arrival of Officer Crabtree, played by Arthur Bostrom and the Gestapo officer Herr Engelbert Von Smallhausen, played by John Louis Mansi. The first Christmas special was commissioned, and aired shortly after the second series. This shows the then rising popularity of the show.

The following episode names are the ones found on the British R2 DVDs with alternate region titles given below them.

Cast

Episodes

References

External links

1985 British television seasons
 2
'Allo 'Allo! seasons